PUHS may refer to:

 Patagonia Union High School, Patagonia, Arizona, USA
 Phoenix Union High School, Phoenix, Arizona, USA

See also

 
 
 Puh, a surname